Monika Bader (born 9 March 1959 in Trauchgau) is a retired German alpine skier who competed in the 1980 Winter Olympics.

External links
 sports-reference.com
 

1959 births
Living people
Olympic alpine skiers of West Germany
Alpine skiers at the 1980 Winter Olympics
German female alpine skiers
People from Ostallgäu
Sportspeople from Swabia (Bavaria)
20th-century German women